Angeia or Angea was a town and polis (city-state) in ancient Thessaly in the district Dolopia. Livy relates that the retreat of Philip V of Macedon after the Battle of the Aous (198 BC) allowed the Aetolians to occupy much of Thessaly, and these latter devastated Angeia and its neighbour, Ctimene.

References

Populated places in ancient Thessaly
Former populated places in Greece
Dolopia
Thessalian city-states